Hainggyi Island, also spelt Haigyi Island may refer to:

Hainggyi Island (town), a town located in the Ayeyarwady Division of south west Burma 
Hainggyi Island (island), an island located in the Ayeyarwady Division of south west Burma
Hainggyikyun Subtownship, an unofficial statistical and administration unit within Ngapudaw Township